Belarusian Braille is the braille alphabet of the Belarusian language. It is based on Russian Braille, with a couple additional letters found in the print Belarusian alphabet.

Alphabet 
Belarusian does not use all the letters of the Russian alphabet, and it has the additional letters і and ў.  

The letters і and ў are the mirror images of й and у, and the і was once found in Russian Braille. (See obsolete letters of Russian Braille.)

Punctuation
Single punctuation:

Paired punctuation:

Formatting

See also 
Ukrainian Braille

References

 UNESCO (2013) World Braille Usage , 3rd edition.

French-ordered braille alphabets
Belarusian language